Vladislav Vyacheslavovich Kozhemyakin (born 9 February 1983) is a former Russian professional footballer.

Club career
He made his debut in the Russian Premier League in 2002 for FC Torpedo Moscow.

References

1983 births
Footballers from Moscow
Living people
Russian footballers
Association football forwards
FC Torpedo Moscow players
FC Spartak Vladikavkaz players
FC Metallurg Lipetsk players
FC Kristall Smolensk players
FC Chernomorets Novorossiysk players
Russian Premier League players
FC Lukhovitsy players
FC Znamya Truda Orekhovo-Zuyevo players
FC Spartak-2 Moscow players